The discography of Hong Kong singer-songwriter, dancer and producer Jackson Wang consists of two studio albums, 19 singles, 36 collaborations and 9 soundtrack appearances for television shows.

Albums

Studio albums

Mixtapes

Singles

As lead artist

As featured artist

Collaborations

Soundtrack appearances

Music videos

See also
 Got7 discography

References

Wang, Jackson